Ja'Whaun Louis Bentley (born August 24, 1996) is an American football linebacker for the New England Patriots of the National Football League (NFL). He played college football at Purdue. He was drafted by the Patriots in the fifth round of the 2018 NFL Draft.

College career
Bentley started all four years at Purdue, from 2014 to 2017. He had 97 tackles including 11.5 for loss in 2017. Bentley was named as an honorable mention for the 2017 All-Big Ten Conference team. He was the defensive MVP of the 2017 Foster Farms Bowl.

Professional career

New England Patriots
Bentley was drafted by the New England Patriots in the fifth round (143rd overall) of the 2018 NFL Draft. In the team's second preseason game, Bentley recovered a fumble forced by Adrian Clayborn and returned it 54 yards for the touchdown. His strong play in the preseason earned Bentley a starting linebacker role alongside veterans Dont'a Hightower and Kyle Van Noy. In Week 3 against the Detroit Lions, Bentley recorded his first career interception on  a pass from Matthew Stafford that was intended for Luke Willson. On September 26, 2018, Bentley was placed on injured reserve, due to a torn bicep. Without Bentley, the Patriots reached Super Bowl LIII, where they defeated the Los Angeles Rams 13-3.

Bentley returned to health in 2019, but with Dont’a Hightower, Jamie Collins, and Kyle Van Noy already in place, Bentley didn’t re-emerge as a key part of the Patriots’ defense.  However, the 2020 season saw Bentley take over as the team’s top linebacker, as Hightower opted out of the season due to COVID-19, and Collins and Van Noy departed in free agency.
In Week 8, against the Buffalo Bills, Bentley recorded his first full sack of his career on Josh Allen during the 24–21 loss.

On March 21, 2022, Bentley signed a two-year, $6 million contract extension with the Patriots. He started all 17 games in 2022, recording a career-high and team-leading 125 tackles, along with three sacks, two passes defensed, and an interception.

References 

1996 births
Living people
American football linebackers
New England Patriots players
People from Prince George's County, Maryland
Players of American football from Maryland
Purdue Boilermakers football players
Sportspeople from the Washington metropolitan area